Franziska Brauße (born 20 November 1998) is a German professional road and track, who currently rides for UCI Women's Continental Team . In 2012, Franziska Brauße won her first national title when she became German champion in the road race for schoolchildren. She is a multiple German champion and European champion. She won the gold medal at the 2020 Summer Olympics on the track in the women's team pursuit with Lisa Brennauer, Mieke Kröger and Lisa Klein, setting the new world record.

Major results

2013
2nd Team Pursuit, National Junior Track Championships

2014
National Junior Track Championships
1st  Individual Pursuit
2nd 500m Time Trial
2nd Team Pursuit

2015 
1st  Team Pursuit, National Junior Track Championships

2016 
National Junior Track Championships
1st  Individual Pursuit
1st  Points Race
1st  Team Pursuit
2nd 500m Time Trial
2nd Time Trial, National Junior Road Championships

2017 
National Track Championships
1st  Madison
2nd Team Pursuit
2nd Omnium
3rd Individual Pursuit
3rd Team Pursuit, European U23 Track Championships

2018 
European U23 Track Championships
2nd Omnium
3rd Team Pursuit

2019 
European Track Championships
1st  Individual Pursuit
2nd Team Pursuit
European U23 Track Championships
1st  Individual Pursuit
3rd Team Pursuit
National Track Championships
1st  Team Pursuit
1st  Omnium

2020 
European U23 Track Championships
1st  Individual Pursuit
2nd Team Pursuit
UCI Track Cycling World Championships
3rd Individual Pursuit
3rd Team Pursuit

2021
 1st  Team pursuit, Olympic Games

References

External links
 
 Website of Franziska Brauße 

1998 births
Living people
German female cyclists
People from Metzingen
Sportspeople from Tübingen (region)
Olympic cyclists of Germany
Cyclists at the 2020 Summer Olympics
Medalists at the 2020 Summer Olympics
Olympic medalists in cycling
Olympic gold medalists for Germany
Cyclists from Baden-Württemberg
21st-century German women